

Virginia Airport  is an airport serving Durban, the largest city in the province of KwaZulu-Natal in South Africa.

This airport was the home of the Durban Airshow before it ran into problems by failing to meet new public safety standards. The Durban Airshow was eventually permanently cancelled due to the close proximity of the crowd line to the runway. Now Virginia Airport primarily serves as a training ground for pilots of varying skills.

The airport was threatened to be closed down in December 2018. The plan was to replace it by a development which would have comprised a hotel, upmarket residential houses as well as leisure and related developments. It was planned to build a new airport in Scottburgh on the South Coast of Durban, what did not materialize because it was disliked by the current Virginia Airport users because it is too far away from the city.

Facilities

The airport is home to the Durban Wings Club and thus boasts having one of the oldest flying clubs in the country.

History 
Virginia Airport was officially opened by the then Mayor of Durban, W E Shaw in June 1959. The opening was commemorated by an air race which ended at Virginia. The decision to open a new airport was motivated by the need to relocate the light aircraft operating out of the Stamford Hill Aerodrome to a more suitably sized aerodrome. At the time the airport commenced operations it was noted that there were no houses in the vicinity and plenty of room for expansion.

Initially just two hangars were relocated from Stamford Hill to Virginia and a few smaller buildings were built. Those same hangars are still in use today.

See also
 List of airports in the Durban area

References

External links
 

Airports in South Africa
Transport in Durban
Buildings and structures in Durban